Dobki may refer to the following places:
Dobki, Masovian Voivodeship (east-central Poland)
Dobki, Podlaskie Voivodeship (north-east Poland)
Dobki, Warmian-Masurian Voivodeship (north Poland)